Navarre Haisila is an Australian rugby union player who played for the  in the Super Rugby competition. He can play multiple positions including Fly-half, centre and wing. He played for Melbourne Rising under National Rugby Championship.

References

External links
Rugby.com.au profile
itsrugby.co.uk profile

Australian rugby union players
Tongan rugby union players
Tonga international rugby union players
Living people
Rugby union fly-halves
Rugby union centres
Rugby union wings
Rugby union fullbacks
Melbourne Rising players
Melbourne Rebels players
1999 births